Gustaw Konstanty Orlicz-Dreszer (October 2, 1889 − July 16, 1936) was a Polish general, and a political and social activist.

Before World War I, Orlicz-Dreszer was involved in pro-independence activities in partitioned Poland. On 3 August 1914, at the outset of the war, he was mobilised as a reserve officer in a Russian hussar regiment. On 14 August, he deserted and crossed the front line. From 1914 to 1917 he served in the 1st Brigade of the Polish Legions.  He was arrested during the Oath Crisis.  From 1918 he served in the Polish Army.

During the Polish-Soviet War he commanded the 4th Cavalry Brigade and the 2nd Cavalry Division. From 1921−23 he was Cavalry Inspector.  In 1923 he was promoted to Brigadier General. In November 1924, he was one of the officers who resigned from active service in the so-called strike of the generals; the joint resignation of the officers was, however, rejected. In 1924−26 he commanded the 2nd and then the 3rd Cavalry Division.  During the [[May Coup (Poland)|May 1926 Coup d'État]] he supported Józef Piłsudski.

In 1930 Orlicz-Dreszer became a member of ZG Liga Morska i Kolonialna (Maritime and Colonial League).  He created and promoted a development program for the Polish merchant marine. From 1930−36 he served as Inspector of the Polish Army and in 1936 as Inspector of Air Defense.
 
Orlicz-Dreszer died in a plane accident, crashing in a RWD-9 plane into the Baltic Sea near Gdynia while flying excessively low.

Awards
 Silver Cross of the Virtuti Militari.
 Grand Cross of the Order of Polonia Restituta (previously awarded the  Commander's Cross)
 Cross of Independence with Swords
 Cross of Valour (Krzyż Walecznych''), four times
 Gold Cross of Merit
 Commander of the Legion of Honour (France)

Sources

References

Bibliography
 Sławomir Koper, Życie prywatne elit Drugiej Rzeczypospolitej, Warszawa 2011 
 Dziennik Personalny Ministra Spraw Wojskowych nr 54 z 23.12.1926 
 Przemysław Olstowski Generał Gustaw Orlicz-Dreszer, Wyd. Adam Marszałek, Toruń 2000
 Zbigniew Mierzwiński: Generałowie II Rzeczypospolitej. Warszawa 1990: Wydawnictwo Polonia, pages 201-208
 Cezary Leżeński / Lesław Kukawski: O kawalerii polskiej XX wieku. Wrocław: Zakład Narodowy im. Ossolińskich, 1991, page 22

1889 births
1936 deaths
People from Wołomin County
People from Warsaw Governorate
Polish Lutherans
Polish people of German descent
Polish generals
Association of the Polish Youth "Zet" members
Polish Military Organisation members
Russian military personnel of World War I
Polish legionnaires (World War I)
Polish people of the Polish–Soviet War
People of the Polish May Coup (pro-Piłsudski side)
Recipients of the Silver Cross of the Virtuti Militari
Recipients of the Cross of Independence with Swords
Grand Crosses of the Order of Polonia Restituta
Recipients of the Cross of Valour (Poland)
Recipients of the Gold Cross of Merit (Poland)
Commandeurs of the Légion d'honneur
20th-century Lutherans
Victims of aviation accidents or incidents in 1936